Leslie Dilley (born 1941) is a Welsh art director and production designer. During his film career from the 1970s to 2000s, he won the Academy Award for Best Art Direction twice for Star Wars (1977) and Raiders of the Lost Ark (1981). Dilley received additional Best Art Direction nominations for Alien (1979), The Empire Strikes Back (1980), and The Abyss (1989). Apart from art direction, Dilley was a production designer for The Exorcist III (1990), Casper (1995), and Son of the Mask (2005).

Early life and education
In 1941, Dilley was born in Rhondda Valley, South Wales. Growing up, Dilley and his family moved to London and lived in Wembley Park. For his post-secondary education, Dilley studied architecture at Willesden Technical College. While working as an apprentice plasterer during college, Dilley was encouraged by a classmate to apply for a job at Pinewood Studios. After Pinewood told him there were no open positions available, Dilley completed a five year plastering apprenticeship at the Associated British Picture Corporation.

Career
At the ABPC, Dilley began his career as a drafter throughout the 1960s. While working as an Assistant Art Director during the early 1970s, Dilley became an art director for The Three Musketeers (1973). His art director tenure continued throughout the 1970s and 1980s with films such as Superman (1978), An American Werewolf in London (1981) and Never Say Never Again (1983). Outside of these movies, Dilley won the Academy Award for Best Art Direction for Star Wars (1977) and Raiders of the Lost Ark (1981). He additionally received Academy Award nominations for his art directorship on Alien (1979), The Empire Strikes Back (1980), and The Abyss (1989).

During the 1990s to 2000s, Dilley primarily worked as a production designer. Some of his production works during these decades include The Exorcist III (1990), Casper (1995), and Son of the Mask (2005). Dilley has also made cameo appearances in his production designed films, including Deep Impact (1998) and Pay It Forward (2000).

Selected filmography
Dilley has won two Academy Awards for Best Art Direction and has been nominated for three more:
Won
 Star Wars (1977)
 Raiders of the Lost Ark (1981)

Nominated
 Alien (1979)
 The Empire Strikes Back (1980)
 The Abyss (1989)

References

External links

1941 births
Living people
Welsh art directors
British film designers
Best Art Direction Academy Award winners
People from Rhondda